Joonas Koskinen (born March 8, 1987) is a Finnish professional ice hockey player. He currently plays for Lempäälän Kisa of the Finnish Mestis.

Koskinen made his SM-liiga debut playing with Tappara during the 2009–10 SM-liiga season.

References

External links

1987 births
Living people
People from Ruovesi
HK Poprad players
Tappara players
Finnish ice hockey centres
Sportspeople from Pirkanmaa
Finnish expatriate ice hockey players in Slovakia
Finnish expatriate ice hockey players in Sweden
Finnish expatriate ice hockey players in Kazakhstan
Finnish expatriate ice hockey players in Denmark
Finnish expatriate ice hockey players in Germany